Yakunikha is a rural locality (a village) in Pogorelovskoye Rural Settlement, Totemsky  District, Vologda Oblast, Russia. The population was 48 as of 2002.

Geography 
Yakunikha is located 61 km southwest of Totma (the district's administrative centre) by road. Fedorovskaya is the nearest rural locality.

References 

Rural localities in Tarnogsky District